RE Engine, also known as Reach for the Moon Engine, is a video game engine created by Capcom. Originally designed for Resident Evil 7: Biohazard, it has since been used in a variety of the company's games such as Devil May Cry 5, Monster Hunter Rise and Street Fighter 6. The engine is a successor to MT Framework, Capcom's previous engine.

History 
RE Engine was created in 2014, during the beginning of the development of Resident Evil 7. The engine was originally designed with the game's linear nature in mind and was created to make game development more efficient. The reason the team did not choose a third-party engine was that "a highly generic engine developed by another company would not be appropriate" for a game like Resident Evil 7. MT Framework was not used for the project due to its slower development tools. Jun Takeuchi, the head of Capcom's Division 1 stated "we had to rethink the way we make games. In order to carry out asset-based (graphic and 3D model elements) development, which is globally the mainstream, we began developing our new RE Engine".

When discussing Monster Hunter Rise, Yasunori Ichinose, the game's director, discussed porting RE Engine to the Nintendo Switch, and said "a lot of background technical engineering work need[ed] to be done just to achieve targeting a new hardware platform", and mentioned the challenge of creating the large maps the team wanted while trying to maintain the game's graphical quality.

Features 

RE Engine features various improvements over MT Framework, including new anti-aliasing and volumetric lighting features. The engine also allows developers to use photogrammetry to create higher quality assets. It also includes improved VR support over its predecessor, allowing it to hit high framerates necessary to avoid motion sickness. It also includes tools to make animation faster, such as modular rigging, motion matching, procedural animation and motion retargeting. RE Engine also has various new physics simulation options which allow for more realistic debris.

Games

References 

Video game engines
Proprietary software
2014 software
Resident Evil
Capcom
3D graphics software